James Frederick Lilja (born May 1966) is an American gynecologic oncologist and a musician from the Los Angeles area, perhaps best known as the first drummer of the punk rock band The Offspring, and performing with the band between 1984 and 1987.

Collegiate education and The Offspring
Lilja attended the University of California, Los Angeles between 1984 and 1988, and from which he graduated with a B.S. degree in Microbiology.

In 1984, Lilja had joined the group Manic Subsidal, which eventually changed its name to The Offspring in 1986. Lilja played on the group's first demo tape in 1986, which earned them early exposure through a positive review in Maximumrocknroll magazine. Later that year, Lilja performed on the band's debut single, "I'll Be Waiting" released through Black Label Records. Lilja also helped write the song "Beheaded," later featured on the group's debut album, The Offspring (1989).
Lilja amicably departed from The Offspring; The Offspring frontman Dexter Holland has said that Lilja was so focused on getting into medical school that the band let him go on friendly terms. Lilja's position in the Offspring was filled by Ron Welty in 1987, who was only 16 years old at the time.

Medical career
Lilja gained admission to the University of Pittsburgh School of Medicine, where he graduated with an M.D. degree in 1993.

After completing medical school, Lilja undertook an internship and residency at the University of Texas Health Science Center at Houston (1994–1997) and a fellowship at the University of Michigan Medical School (1998–2000). In 2001, he was board-certified by the American Board of Obstetrics and Gynecology as an obstetrician and gynecologist. He finished his fellowship at the University of Michigan in gynecologic oncology. In 2003, he was double board-certified as an obstetrician-gynecologist and gynecologic oncologist. He has practices in both San Jose and Fremont.

In 2018, while on trial in Oakland, California for medical malpractice Lilja saved the life of a potential juror who went into cardiac arrest during the jury selection. Afterwards the judge ruled a mistrial to avoid biases from any of the potential jurors who saw him save a life, and rescheduled his trial for a later date. The case went to arbitration and was dismissed.

Later music endeavors
During medical school, Lilja formed a band with other medical students called the Oral Groove. In 2009, Lilja formed a band 11x. Lilja retains an active interest in rock music between practicing medicine. Lilja's latest band, Bunko was formed in 2018. Their debut EP, Thought Patrol was released on August 25, 2019.

Discography
With Manic Subsidal
 We Got Power Part II – Party Animal (1985)

With The Offspring
 6 Songs Demo Tape (1986)
 I'll Be Waiting (1986)
 The Offspring (1989) (songwriting only)

With Bunko
 Thought Patrol (EP) (2019)
 "Halloween in China" (single) (2019)
 "Normal Guy" (single) (2019)
 "Dipship Man" (single) (2019)

References

External links

Living people
American punk rock drummers
American male drummers
The Offspring members
American gynecologists
University of Michigan Medical School alumni
1966 births
20th-century American drummers